The 2008 NRL Under-20s season was the first season of the National Rugby League's youth competition, known as the Toyota Cup due to sponsorship from Toyota. The draw and structure of the competition mirrors that of its senior counterpart, the 2008 Telstra Premiership.

Season summary

Schedule

NYC Records

Ladder

Ladder progression
Numbers highlighted in green indicate that the team finished the round inside the top 8.

Finals series

Grand final

A Spectacular try to second-rower Jarrad Kennedy seven minutes into golden-point extra time gave Canberra a thrilling 28-24 victory over Brisbane in the U20 rugby league grand final at ANZ Stadium.

Kennedy was mobbed by jubilant Raiders teammates after collapsing over the line in exhaustion after willing himself to back up centre Jarrod Croker, who had collected a cross-field kick from halfback Matt Smith as the clock wound down.

Canberra won the hard way, though, recovering from 20-12 down early in the second half and then needing a missed conversion attempt from Broncos halfback Ben Hunt to force extra time.

Gunning for their eighth straight victory, Brisbane made a worrying start, conceding a soft try to five-eighth Michael Picker, which fullback Josh Dugan converted for a 6-0 lead after 10 minutes.

The Broncos steadied and went to the interval with a 16-12 buffer after tries to Hunt, interchange forward Michael Spence and winger Jharal Yow Yeh.

The Broncos looked set to go on with the job when centre Brendon Gibb crossed out wide in the opening minutes of the second half, but the Raiders refused to lie down.

A second try to Michael Picker and a goose-stepping four-pointer to winger Drury Low, plus Dugan's heroics, eventually set the scene for Kennedy's match-winning play.

Match Summary

Statistics

Top Pointscorers

Top Tryscorers

Awards

Toyota Cup Player of the Year
The winner of the award is decided by the most votes during the year as decided by the referee of each game on a 3-2-1 basis for each game played throughout the regular season.
Winner:
Ben Hunt, Brisbane
Nominated:
Ben Barba, Bulldogs
Eddie Paea, South Sydney
Matt Mundine, St. George Illawarra

Toyota Cup team of the Year

The Toyota Cup team of the Year is voted on by the 16 Toyota Cup coaches, with the players with the highest votes in each position selected.

References

 
NRL Under-20s season